Vice-Admiral Robert Clutterbuck Davenport CB (13 April 1882 – 15 June 1965) was a Royal Navy officer who became Commander-in-Chief, Coast of Scotland.

Naval career
Educated on HMS Britannia, Davenport joined the Royal Navy as a cadet in 1896. He was confirmed as a sub-lieutenant on 15 April 1901, served in the Second Boer War and World War I. He became Commanding Officer of the cruiser  in 1924 and the battleship  in 1930 and went on to be Commander-in-Chief, Coast of Scotland in 1935. He retired in 1938 but was recalled to serve in World War II as Commodore of Convoys from 1939 and then on the Selection Board for Temporary Commissions in the Royal Naval Volunteer Reserve from 1941 until his final retirement in 1946.

Family
In 1917 he married Gwladwys Mabel Halahan (née Gwatkin-Williams).

References

1882 births
1965 deaths
Companions of the Order of the Bath
Royal Navy vice admirals
People from Abingdon-on-Thames
Royal Navy personnel of the Second Boer War
Royal Navy personnel of World War I